Paramulona schwarzi is a moth of the subfamily Arctiinae first described by William Dewitt Field in 1951. It is found on Cuba.

References

Lithosiini
Endemic fauna of Cuba